Nico Granatowski (born 3 June 1991) is a German professional footballer who plays as a midfielder.

Honours
1. FC Magdeburg
3. Liga: 2021–22

References

External links
 

Living people
1991 births
Sportspeople from Braunschweig
Association football midfielders
German footballers
VfL Wolfsburg II players
SG Sonnenhof Großaspach players
Sportfreunde Lotte players
SV Meppen players
VfL Osnabrück players
FC Hansa Rostock players
1. FC Magdeburg players
2. Bundesliga players
3. Liga players
Regionalliga players
Footballers from Lower Saxony